The Petaling District is a district located in the heart of Selangor in Malaysia. Petaling is not to be confused with the city of Petaling Jaya located in it, nor the mukim of Petaling under Petaling Jaya City. The district office is located in Subang.

The district of Petaling was established on 1 February 1974, the same day Kuala Lumpur was declared a Federal Territory.  This district is located in the middle of the Klang Valley adjacent to the capital and thus has experienced tremendous urbanisation. Some of the original forests remain in the Bukit Cherakah Forest Reserve (including the National Botanic Gardens), Kota Damansara Community Forest Park and Bukit Gasing. During the 1991 census, it recorded 633,165 people.

The official 2010 census recorded the population of Petaling as 1,660,869 people, excluding foreigners. Petaling is 484.32 km² in area. The urban centres are divided into the cities of Shah Alam, Petaling Jaya and Subang Jaya. However, there are numerous town subdivisions, old subdistrict administrations (mukim), all of which share the same names like Damansara, Subang, and Petaling, which add much to the administrative confusion along with the rapid growth. Some five types of subdivisions exist for Petaling District, namely the re-organized municipal council majlis, the majlis subdivisions, the community names (also known as townships), electoral constituencies, and the subdivisions ("mukim").

It is host to many thriving townships such as the Damansara area, which hosts several shopping malls including a Tesco and an IKEA outlet. Sultan Abdul Aziz Shah Airport is situated in Subang.

Population

The following is based on Department of Statistics Malaysia 2010 census.

Administrative divisions

Petaling District is divided into 4 mukims.  However, this definition is for historic administrative purposes only and does not reflect the modern rapid growth and subsequent reorganisation in 1997.

Government

The district is highly urbanised, and as such, the administration and maintenance of the public facilities in the district have been divided and delegated to the three local governments.

Shah Alam City Council

The Shah Alam City Council (MBSA) governs the city centre of Shah Alam. It also exercises jurisdiction over some parts of the south of Klang District, Bukit Raja, Setia Alam, Subang and Sungai Buloh area.

Petaling Jaya City Council

The city council (MBPJ) administers the area of the city of Petaling Jaya which includes Damansara (Petaling Jaya Utara, PJU), Petaling Jaya centre and most of Petaling Jaya Selatan (PJS) except PJS7/PJS9/PJS11 (commonly known as Bandar Sunway) which is partially jurisdictional and postcode allocated for location purposes, and SS12-SS19 which previously administrates under MBPJ previous incarnation Petaling Jaya Municipal Council (MPPJ), transferred the administration power to Subang Jaya Municipal Council (MPSJ) on 1997, the same year MPSJ was upgraded from Petaling District Council.

Subang Jaya City Council

The city council governs the southern parts of the district with the main populated areas such as Subang Jaya, UEP Subang Jaya (USJ), Putra Heights, Batu Tiga, parts of Puchong and Seri Kembangan under its jurisdiction.

Federal Parliament and State Assembly Seats

List of Petaling district representatives in the Federal Parliament (Dewan Rakyat) 

List of Petaling district representatives in the State Legislative Assembly (Dewan Undangan Negeri)

See also

 Districts of Malaysia

References